The 14109 / 10 Chitrakoot Dham (Karwi)–Kanpur Central Intercity Express is an Express  train belonging to Indian Railways North Central Railway zone that runs between Chitrakoot Dham (Karwi) and  in India.

Coaches
The 14109 / 10 Chitrakoot Dham (Karwi)–Kanpur Central Intercity Express has five general unreserved, two SLR (seating with luggage rake) coaches and one reserved 3AC coach now . It does not carry a pantry car coach.

As is customary with most train services in India, coach composition may be amended at the discretion of Indian Railways depending on demand.

Service

Routing

Traction
As the route is electrified, a   based WDM-3A diesel locomotive pulls the train to its destination.

References

External links
14109 Intercity Express at India Rail Info
14110 Intercity Express at India Rail Info

Intercity Express (Indian Railways) trains
Trains from Kanpur
Chitrakoot district